Owen Ellis Owen (22 November 1935 – 26 August 2021),  known as Taffy Owen, was an international speedway rider from Wales.

Speedway career 
Owen rode in the top tier of British Speedway from 1965 to 1977, riding for various clubs. In 1968, he finished 5th in the league averages during the 1968 British League Division Two season, riding for Belle Vue Colts. He continued to score heavily throughout his career hitting a 8+ average for Workington Comets from 1974 to 1976.

References 

1936 births
2021 deaths
British speedway riders
Welsh speedway riders
Belle Vue Aces riders
Newcastle Diamonds riders
Oxford Cheetahs riders
Sheffield Tigers riders
Workington Comets riders
Sportspeople from Anglesey